Lenoir Rock is the rock off the NW coast of Smith Island in the South Shetland Islands, Antarctica 230 m long in southwest-northeast direction and 85 m wide with a surface area of 1.29 ha. The vicinity was visited by early 19th century sealers.

The feature is named after Étienne Lenoir (1744-1832), a French scientific instrument maker and inventor of the repeating circle; in association with other names in the area deriving from the early development or use of geodetic instruments and methods.

Location
Bulgarian mapping in 2009 and 2017.

See also
 List of Antarctic and subantarctic islands

Maps
 L. Ivanov. Antarctica: Livingston Island and Greenwich, Robert, Snow and Smith Islands. Scale 1:120000 topographic map. Troyan: Manfred Wörner Foundation, 2010.  (First edition 2009. )
 South Shetland Islands: Smith and Low Islands. Scale 1:150000 topographic map No. 13677. British Antarctic Survey, 2009
 L. Ivanov. Antarctica: Livingston Island and Smith Island. Scale 1:100000 topographic map. Manfred Wörner Foundation, 2017. 
 Antarctic Digital Database (ADD). Scale 1:250000 topographic map of Antarctica. Scientific Committee on Antarctic Research (SCAR). Since 1993, regularly upgraded and updated

Notes

References
 Bulgarian Antarctic Gazetteer. Antarctic Place-names Commission. (details in Bulgarian, basic data in English)

External links
 Lenoir Rock. Adjusted Copernix satellite image

Smith Island (South Shetland Islands)
Rock formations of the South Shetland Islands
Bulgaria and the Antarctic